Nelson Zeglio (21 November 1926 – 25 February 2019) was a Brazilian professional footballer.

Career
Born in São Paulo, Zeglio moved from São Paulo to French club Sochaux in 1951. He was one of three South Americans to sign for the club at that time (the others being José Montagnoli and Alberto Muro, who were both Argentine). He was the first Brazilian to play for Sochaux, and the only one until Francileudo Santos and Alexandre Finazzi signed in 2000. He made his Sochaux debut on 9 September 1951, scoring his club's only goal in a 3–1 defeat against Lens. He moved on loan to Montpellier in January 1952, and later played for CA Paris and Roubaix-Tourcoing. He finished his career playing back in Brazil.

Later life and death
After retirement, Zeglio worked for Air France for 20 years. In November 2016, on his 90th birthday, Zeglio was Sochaux's eldest living former player.

He died on 25 February 2019, aged 92.

References

1926 births
2019 deaths
Brazilian footballers
São Paulo FC players
FC Sochaux-Montbéliard players
Montpellier HSC players
CA Paris-Charenton players
CO Roubaix-Tourcoing players
Ligue 1 players
Ligue 2 players
Association football forwards
Brazilian expatriate footballers
Brazilian expatriate sportspeople in France
Expatriate footballers in France
Footballers from São Paulo